Perissoneura paradoxa is a species of caddisfly in the genus Perissoneura of the family Odontoceridae.

References

Trichoptera

https://www.gbif.org/species/5053351